The following is a list of events relating to television in Ireland from 1968.

Events

January – RTÉ's Director-General Kevin McCourt makes the controversial decision to recall the Seven Days crew as they are en route to report on the Biafran War.
12 February – Director-General McCourt announces the transfer of responsibility for Seven Days to the RTÉ News Division, a decision which leads to industrial unrest and the suspension of several members of the production team for "blacking" the programme on air. The dispute is finally resolved in March.
16 March – Thomas P. Hardiman replaced Kevin McCourt as Director-General of RTÉ, and is the first Director-General to be appointed internally within the organisation.
5 October – RTÉ cameraman Gay O'Brien and soundman Eamon Hayes film a civil rights march in Derry, Northern Ireland during which RUC officers baton charge the crowd and use a water cannon.

Ongoing television programmes
RTÉ News: Nine O'Clock (1961–present)
Dáithí Lacha (1962–1969)
RTÉ News: Six One (1962–present)
The Late Late Show (1962–present)
Newsbeat (1964–1971)
The Riordans (1965–1979)
Quicksilver (1965–1981)
Seven Days (1966–1976)
Wanderly Wagon (1967–1982)

Ending this year
1 January – Me and My Friend (1967–1968)
31 May – Tolka Row (1964–1968)

Births
Undated – Alan Cantwell, newsreader

See also
1968 in Ireland

References

 
1960s in Irish television